Killaloe is the Regimental Quick March of the British Army regiment, The Royal Irish Regiment (27th (Inniskilling) 83rd and 87th and Ulster Defence Regiment). It has informal, historical associations with other Irish Regiments and Brigades: as an unofficial march by the Connaught Rangers and Royal Inniskilling Fusiliers and at brigade level in World War II by the 38th (Irish) Infantry Brigade. Further to this it has also been adopted by the PSNI Pipe Band at passing out parades for new recruits.  It is also the regimental march of the South African Irish Regiment.

History 
"Killaloe" is a popular march in the Irish Regiments of the British Army, written in 1887 by a 41-year-old Irish composer named Robert "Ballyhooly Bob" Martin of Ross, for the Strand located Gaiety Theatre musical production "Miss Esmeralda", a burlesque production based on  "The Hunchback of Notre Dame".  Mr E. J. Lonnen, playing Frollo the monk, sang the song to great acclaim.

Robert Martin was the elder brother of Violet Martin, more famous as "Martin Ross" of the literary cousins "Somerville & Ross", who wrote "Remniscences of an Irish R.M." and other stories.  Bob Martin gained his nickname from his even more famous hit of the time "Ballyhooly March". As a Galway estate landowner he was related through his bohemian cousin Willie Wills, the famous Victorian court artist and composer, to General John Doyle, who founded the 87th, later the Royal Irish Fusiliers.  Martin was so impoverished by the Land League rent strikes that he moved to London and turned to journalism, burlesque song writing and politics. He worked for the Sporting Chronicle, nicknamed "The Pink'un", on account of the colour of the paper, a Victorian version of  "Private Eye" crossed with "News of the World".

He was also a member of the Pelican Club, a notorious group of aristocracy, gentry, sportsmen, army officers, sporting journalists and other colourful characters who believed in living life to the full, usually well beyond their means, and who held court at Romano's restaurant in the Strand, near the Gaiety Theatre.  A significant number of the aristocracy scandalised Victorian society by marrying "Gaiety Girls" who provided the glamour in the burlesque productions, hence the nickname "The actressocracy" for these socially climbing girls.  PG Wodehouse took many of the exploits of this Victorian social group, he was a young reporter at the time, and subsequently reset them very successfully in the 1920s and 30s, around the exploits of Bertie Wooster and his butler Jeeves. The character of Galahad Threepwood, brother to the Earl of Emsworth, is an actual member of the Pelicans (cf. "A Pelican at Blandings").

Martin was politically active as a boycotted landowner, staunch unionist, political activist, an "Emergency man"  and a close associate of Arthur Balfour, first Secretary for Ireland and later Prime Minister. His virulent Anti Home Rule views are reflected in his songs, which consistently depict the Irish as drunken, brawling if loveable rogues who were clearly unfit to govern themselves.  Martin wrote about thirty songs for various burlesque productions, including "Murphy of the Irish Fusiliers", although a copy of this has yet to surface.

Lyrics

Original Lyrics 

You may talk of Bonyparty.....

Connaught Ranger Lyrics 
The Devil's Own had lyrics of their own, composed in c.1890 by Lieutenant Charles Martin:

{{cquote|
In our army we're the best
From the north, south, east or west
The best of boys are following the drum.
We are mighty hard to bate,
I may say without concete,
Faith the enemy are welcome when they come.
Be they Russian, French or Dutch
It doesn't matter much,
We're the boys to give 'em sugar in their tay
For we're the Connaught Rangers,
The lads to face all dangers,
Faugh-a-ballagh, faugh-a-aballagh, Clear the way!

Chorus:

You may talk about your guards boysYour lancers and hussars boysYour fusiliers and royal artillery (without the guns)The girls we drive'em crazy, the foe we beat them easyThe rangers from old Connaught, yaarrr, the land across the sea!Now allow me here to state,
It is counted quite a trate,
In old Ireland just for fight for friends's sake
To crack your neighbor's head,
Or maybe your own instead.
Faith 'tis just the fun and glory of a wake
So you see all Irish boys are accustomed to such noise
It's as natural as drinking whiskey neat.
For there's none among them all, from Kingston to Donegal,
Like the gallant Connaught Ranger on his beat.

Chorus

T'was Bonaparte who said as the Frenchmen on he led
Marshall Soult, be them the Rangers do you know?
Faith says Soult, there's no mistake, to our heels we'd better take
I think it's time for you and I to go.
When the colleens hear their step, it makes their hearts to leap
Aaargh, jewels will ye wist till Parrick's day?
For they are the Connaught Rangers, the boys that fear no dangers
And they're the lads that always take the sway.

Chorus

Now you haven't far to search, for the lads who best can march
The lads that never fear the longest day,
Faith you easily will know, their dashing step will show
Tis the Connaught boys who always lead the way.
If me words perhaps you doubt, come and join 'em on a route
I'm thinkin' you'll not find it quite a treat;
You'll see them in the van, you may catch them if you can
Faith you'll have to travel fast or you'll be late.
}}

 Royal Irish Ranger lyrics 
The soldiers of the Royal Irish Rangers had their own words to the tune which would be sung, sotto voce'', as they marched. They may be based on the Connaught Ranger version:

References

External links
Irelandsotherpoetry.spaces.live.com, 'Ballyhooly' Bob Martin.  Story and complete original lyrics.
Sound recording: youtube.com
Video recordings: youtube.com, youtube.com
CD and MP3 purchase: amazon.co.uk

British military marches
Canadian military marches
Irish songs
Royal Irish Regiment (1992)